Giacomo Raffaelli (born ) is an Italian male volleyball player. He is part of the Italy men's national volleyball team. On club level he plays for Emma Villas.

References

External links
 profile at FIVB.org

1995 births
Living people
Italian men's volleyball players
Place of birth missing (living people)
Volleyball players at the 2015 European Games
European Games competitors for Italy
Competitors at the 2018 Mediterranean Games
Mediterranean Games gold medalists for Italy
Mediterranean Games medalists in volleyball
Universiade medalists in volleyball
Universiade gold medalists for Italy
Medalists at the 2019 Summer Universiade